Kevin Kallady (4 July 1923 – 7 September 2008) was an  Australian rules footballer who played with St Kilda in the Victorian Football League (VFL).

Kallady was captain-coach of Narrandera Football Club in the South West Football League (New South Wales) in 1949.

Notes

External links 

1923 births
2008 deaths
Australian rules footballers from Victoria (Australia)
St Kilda Football Club players